Claver College, Raimat, Lleida, was founded by the Society of Jesus in 1970, and educates ages 3 through 18.

See also
 List of Jesuit sites

References  

Jesuit secondary schools in Spain
Educational institutions established in 1970